The Verde Island Passage is a strait that separates the islands of Luzon and Mindoro in the Philippines, connecting the South China Sea with the Tayabas Bay and the Sibuyan Sea beyond. Traditionally, the sea lane has been one of the busiest in the Philippines because it acts as a corridor from the Port of Manila to the Visayas and Mindanao in the south. A network of ferry routes cross the passage and connect the surrounding provinces of Batangas, Marinduque, Occidental Mindoro, Oriental Mindoro and Romblon. The 1.14 million hectare passage is extremely rich in marine biodiversity and has been called "Center of the Center of Marine Shorefish Biodiversity" with various conservation groups pushing for its nomination as a UNESCO World Heritage Site.

Diving
Verde Island, located right in the center of the strait, is a popular diving location in the Philippines due to its clear waters and renowned biodiverse marine life. Daily trips for scuba divers are made from Puerto Galera.

The wreckage of a Spanish galleon that sunk in 1620 is located in the South of the passage. Most of the ship's cargo was salvaged from the wreckage between 1970 and 1990. Today, nothing remains of the wreck except for a few shards of porcelain and some larger pieces of terracotta jars. The keel was removed and is now located in Puerto Galera for conservation. However, some timbers from the keel remained and were left to rot at a depth of 6 meters in front of Sabang Beach.

Center of the Center of Marine Shorefish Biodiversity
A team of marine conservationists declared in 2006 that the Philippines is the Center of Marine Biodiversity in the world and Verde Island Passage as the "Center of the Center of Marine Shorefish Biodiversity".

Many threatened species which include sea turtles like hawksbills, olive ridleys, and green turtles; humphead wrasses, giant groupers and giant clams are present in the Verde Island Passage. However, there are no enforcement of ordinances and over-fishing is common. A short-lived 'park fee' scheme for the Verde Island drop-off dive site was soon dropped when it was discovered that the revenue was being used to buy better fishing gear and hence removing fish at a higher rate. Several species such as the humphead wrass have low catches frequently reporting 0 catches. It was particularly noted the rare red fin wrasse (Cirrhilabrus rubripinnis) thrives in Verde Island.

There is a complete moratorium of all types of fishing in the Batangas Bays and around Mindoro island. The fish sold in the markets of Puerto Galera comes from distance places such as Romblon.

Conservation alarms
The other main contributor to sustained marine diversity is the damage caused by commercial vessels and other ferries using the passage on a daily basis. It is common that commercial vehicles discharge various pollutants into the waters on which the municipalities and other local bodies have no control. In stormy times, large vehicles are seen anchoring to the corals in the area causing damage to them. The conservation message has to be put cross to major commercial shipping lines and the crews need to be educated on the diversity of the Verde Passage and the dire need for its protection. There are other major issues that affect the sustainability of the Verde Passage. The heavy use of agro-chemicals (pesticides and chemical fertilizer) in the up-stream of Batangas River and the resultant wash off down the river and finally into the Batangas Bays is a serious issue that warrants attention. The discharge of urban waste and grey water in Puerto Galera and other urban areas into the numerous bays around the passage is yet another major issue. The treatment of grey water and septic effluent is not practiced which is a huge concern. The growing tourism aggravates this problem.

The area has more than 300 species of corals, which is considered one of the largest concentrations of corals in the country, or possibly, the whole world. Coral health is generally good, though the effects of global warming and increased pollution, may still lead to a drop in diversity. The Verde Island passage is located next to Batangas Bay which is rapidly becoming a major refining and petrol chemical center in the Philippines. Until now, no infrastructure is in place to contain a major oil, or chemical spill.

Information and awareness
The Passage is recognised for its marine diversity with an awareness for the need to protect the strait from over fishing through conversation programs and talks from academics. Marine parks and ocean guards have also been created to increase the conversation of wildlife. Although, academics have made calls for more to be done to protect the Verde Island Passage while still supporting the local population.

See also
Apo Reef
Tubbataha Reef

References

External links
 gmanews.tv/video, Born To Be Wild: Verde Passage – 31 January 2008

Straits of the Philippines
Landforms of Batangas